Parmouti 9 - Coptic Calendar - Parmouti 11

The tenth day of the Coptic month of Parmouti, the eighth month of the Coptic year. In common years, this day corresponds to April 5, of the Julian Calendar, and April 18, of the Gregorian Calendar. This day falls in the Coptic Season of Shemu, the season of the Harvest.

Commemorations

Saints 

 The departure of Saint Isaac the disciple of Saint Apollo 
 The departure of Pope Gabriel II, 70th Patriarch of the See of Saint Mark

References 

Days of the Coptic calendar